Pratdip is a municipality in the comarca of Baix Camp, in the province of Tarragona, Catalonia, Spain.

Most of the people of Pratdip work in agriculture in the pastures, fields, and forests around the village. Prominent local agricultural products are hazelnuts and almonds.

History
The oldest documents that refer to Pratdip by name are papal bulls of Pope Anastasius IV in 1154.

In medieval times the town was part of the Barony of Entença.

References

 Panareda Clopés, Josep Maria; Rios Calvet, Jaume; Rabella Vives, Josep Maria (1989). Guia de Catalunya, Barcelona: Caixa de Catalunya.  (Spanish).  (Catalan).

External links

Informació turística de Pratdip
 Pratdip Town Hall webpage
 Government data pages 

Municipalities in Baix Camp
Populated places in Baix Camp